Bartolomé Masó is a municipality and town in the Granma Province of Cuba.

Overview
The municipality was named after the Cuban patriot Bartolomé Masó Márquez. It is the home of the Comandancia General de La Plata, headquarters of the Cuban revolutionaries around Fidel Castro and today a museum, located in the Sierra Maestra mountains.

Demographics
In 2004, the municipality of Bartolomé Masó had a population of 53,024.

See also
Municipalities of Cuba
List of cities in Cuba

References

External links

Populated places in Granma Province